This is a list of Champions of the Goa Professional League ever sense its creation in 1951 as the Goan First Division.

History
The official league in Goa, called the First Division began in 1951 and it was organised by the Conselho de Desportos. There was no Super League. The first League champion of Goa was Clube Desportivo de Chinchinim who beat Football Club of Siolim, to clinch the title.

The League continued under the aegis of the Conselho de Desportos till the season of 1958-59, with Clube de Desportos de Vasco da Gama taking the title that year. In 1959, the Goa Football Association was established as the official administrative body of football and from that season onwards the league was conducted by GFA. The 1959-60 League was conducted by the GFA and Clube Independente de Margao emerged champions.

In 1970-71 season, apart from the Senior Division League, there came into existence the first division league which was split into two groups, namely the North Zone and South Zone. While the North Zone consisted of teams from Ilhas and Bardez the South Zone accommodated teams from Mormugao and Salcete.

In 1977, the Goa Football Association introduced the Super League in the season of 1977-78, with Salgaocar Sports Club clinching the title. With football, globally, continuing to develop at a fast pace, the Goa Football Association, decided it was time to push the game onto a higher platform. Goa emerged as the first State ever in the country, to go professional with the game and till date it remains the only State in the country, where the status of the game is professional.

The first Professional League was launched in the 1998-99 season with 5 teams.

The Professional league was expanded to six teams from the 2000-2001 season, after the GFA thought it wise to increase the number and increase the competitiveness factor, and since 2002 the league was played as an eight team league with home-and-away fixtures making it 14 matches for each club. The GFA then announced that the 2011 season would be played with 10 teams under a new format in which Salgaocar won in.

List of champions

First Division League

Super League

Goa Professional League

Most titles

See also
 Goa Professional League
 Goa Football Association

References

Champions
Football Champions